Horacio Peña may refer to:

Horacio Peña (actor) (born 1936), Argentine actor
Horacio Peña (author) (born 1936), Nicaraguan author and poet